Warner Leisure Hotels is a hospitality company owning 14 country and coastal properties around the UK in North Wales, Somerset, Herefordshire, Berkshire, North Yorkshire, Nottinghamshire, Isle of Wight, Suffolk, Hampshire and Warwickshire. Since 1994, its hotels have been adult-only.

History

Captain Harry Warner opened Northney Holiday Camp at Hayling Island in 1932, this camp would eventually close for housing development. In 1937 he opened Coronation Holiday Camp (now known as Lakeside Coastal Village) and later purchased Sinah Warren in the 1960s. Warner Holidays purchased Mill Rythe Holiday Camp (formally known as Sunshine Holiday Camp) from its previous owner, Butlins. This site is now owned by AwayResorts. Seaton Holiday Camp was merged with the neighbouring Blue Waters Camp in the 1990s to become Lyme Bay Holiday camp.

After initial adult-only offerings at Bembridge, Corton and Lakeside (with their other camps remaining family-oriented) Warner Holidays became a completely adult-only brand in 1994.

Mill Rythe, Lyme Bay and Harcourt Sands (originally Puckpool and St. Clare camps) were transferred to Haven Holidays in the mid-1990s. All three were later sold off, with Lyme Bay and Harcourt Sands closing down in the early 2000s.

Warner also had camps at Minster-on-Sea on the Isle of Sheppey and Dovercourt, where some scenes in Hi-de-Hi! were filmed. During the 1990s, it also had a brochure for Warner self-catering sites.

In 2000, Bourne Holidays Limited bought the Rank Group's holidays division, which consisted of the Warner, Butlins and Haven Holidays brands. Bourne Leisure is privately owned UK business, with its head office based in Hemel Hempstead.

List of hotels

Nidd Hall Hotel

Nidd Hall Hotel is a grade II listed mansion near Harrogate, Yorkshire, built in the 1820s.

Thoresby Hall Hotel

Thoresby Hall Hotel is a Grade I-listed house on the 100-acre Thoresby Estate, in Sherwood Forest, Nottinghamshire. The hotel opened in 2000 with grounds consisting of 30 acres of gardens.

Corton Coastal Village

Corton Coastal Village, in Corton, Suffolk, was originally part of the Colman Estate; at the end of the 19th century Jeremiah Colman built a house called The Clyffe. Warner bought part of the estate in 1946 and began to develop it as a modern coastal holiday village.

Gunton Hall Coastal Village
Gunton Hall Coastal Village consists of chalets and lodges. There are six "Royale" large rooms within the main building. It was built around the Grade II-listed Gunton Hall in 55 acres of grounds close to the Suffolk coastal town of Lowestoft.

Architect Matthew Brettingham designed the 18th-century manor hall. In 1810 the new owner, Thomas Fowler, built the smaller New Hall, which now serves as a reception building.

Sinah Warren Hotel

Sinah Warren Hotel, at Sinah, Hayling Island near Portsmouth, has been a Warner site since being purchased in the 1960s.

Lakeside

Lakeside consists of chalets located on the coast of Hayling Island. Opened as Coronation Holiday Camp and renovated and renamed in the 1980s as Lakeside Holiday Centre. Lakeside is located on the edge of a lake which attracts wildlife including swans and migrating birds. Lakeside was originally called ‘Coronation’ to mark the accession in 1937 of King George VI and was co-opted during World War II as a naval barracks and designated HMS Northney.

Bembridge Coast Hotel

Bembridge Coast Hotel is on the eastern shore of the Isle of Wight, overlooking the Solent. The hotel was originally a house built in 1905 named Fuzze Freeze, but during World War II it was taken over by the Admiralty and named HMS Blazer. After the war the site became a private home and then a Yellands Chalet Hotel before it was bought by Warner in 1965 and subsequently opened as an adults-only hotel in 1979.

Norton Grange Coastal Village

Located on the Isle of Wight, Norton Grange was built in 1760, and has been a holiday destination since the 1930s, except from a spell as an operational base for the Admiralty during World War II. Warner Leisure Hotels took ownership of the site from Yellands Chalet Hotels in 1966. It was known as Yarmouth Holiday Camp for a number of years before being renamed as Norton Grange in the 1990s.

Cricket St Thomas Hotel

Cricket St Thomas Hotel is a conversion of a Grade II-listed Regency mansion set in a valley in Somerset. The grounds were designed by a student of Capability Brown. The site was the home of Admiral Lord Rodney, and later Alexander Hood. The house was converted into a hotel in the late 20th century.

Littlecote House Hotel

Littlecote House Hotel in Berkshire is a Grade I-listed Tudor property with 113 acres of gardens which was bought by Warner in 1996.

The first Littlecote House was built by the de Calstone family in the 14th century. Their descendant, Sir George Darrel, expanded the mansion in the 1500s. It was later rebuilt by Sir John Popham in the 1590s.

Littlecote House is home to the Jerusalem Stairs, the Dutch Parlour, a secret passage behind the library bookcase, and the rooms where the D-Day landings were planned. Within the grounds are a Roman mosaic and the remains of Littlecote Roman Villa.

Holme Lacy House Hotel

Holme Lacy House Hotel is a Grade I-listed mansion located in the Wye Valley, near Hereford. The hotel has a nine-hole golf course which was redeveloped in 2014.

In 1674 John Scudamore, 2nd Viscount Scudamore built the mansion as it stands today, extending earlier houses built by his ancestors.

Alvaston Hall Hotel

Alvaston Hall Hotel is a half-timbered Victorian country house located near Nantwich.

In the early 1800s the property, which was then called The Grove, was sold by Crousdon Tunstall, a Quaker banker and farmer. The new owner, Francis Massey, undertook rebuilding work before the house was bought again in 1896 by Arthur Knowles, who then carried out further alterations.

Bodelwyddan Castle Hotel

Bodelwyddan Castle Hotel is a Grade II-listed Victorian folly in north-east Wales close to the Clwydian Mountains. The father of Sir John Williams, first baronet of Bodelwyddan, remodelled the site's original Elizabethan house and raised the mansion. Bodelwyddan Castle was developed after 1830 when battlements, extensions and internal modifications were added by Sir John's successors. The site was designed to look like a castle but was requisitioned by the army for nearby Kinmel Barracks where they used to practice trench warfare. The folly was also home to the National Portrait Gallery’s Victorian collection between 1988 and 2017.

The hotel was distinct from the castle building but in mid-2021, Bourne Leisure Hotels agreed to purchase the actual castle. Bourne planned to fully refurbish the building and planned to operate it via the Warner Leisure Hotels subsidiary. The Council would retain the woodland, the meadow, a car park and the agricultural lands as well as the small lodge on the edge of the property.

Studley Castle

Studley Castle is a 19th-century country house at Studley, Warwickshire, England. The Grade II* listed building was once owned by the Lyttleton family before being bequeathed by Philip Lyttleton to his niece Dorothy, who married Francis Holyoake.

Their son Francis Lyttleton Holyoake, the High Sheriff of Warwickshire in 1834, inherited Ribston Hall in Yorkshire from a business partner in 1833 and changed his name to Holyoake-Goodricke. The sale of the Yorkshire property financed the building of a new mansion at Studley. The new house, designed in Gothic Revival style by the architect Samuel Beazley, was completed in 1836.

The house was occupied by Studley College between 1903 and the early 1960s and was used as a horticultural training establishment for ladies. It later became offices for the British Leyland and Rover Group car companies.

In more recent times a section of the Castle was converted for use as a hotel. After a £50 million refurbishment, and the addition of a music venue, the hotel reopened in April 2019 as the 14th property in the Warner Leisure Hotels collection. An industry news item in November 2018 stated that the new hotel planned to offer "209 rooms ...two restaurants, a cinema, bars and lounges, a spa, a range of outdoor pursuits to enjoy (laser clay, cycling, archery), and one of the largest live performance venues on the UK hotel scene". A company spokesperson was quoted as saying that it had "expertly restored the castle to its former glory ... a historic castle with 21st century technology.

Former sites

Mill Rythe Holiday Camp 
Originally called Sunshine Holiday Camp, purchased in the 1980s.This site on Hayling Island is still open and owned and operated by Away Resorts. The camp was renovated and changed in the early 2020s into a caravan park.

Puckpool Holiday Camp and St Clare Holiday Camp
These two camps were next to each other and merged in the 1990s as Harcourt Sands. This site closed around 2006.

Seaton Holiday Camp 
This merged with a neighbouring Blue Waters camp and was renamed Lyme Bay. This site has since closed and has been redeveloped as a supermarket.

Dovercourt Bay 
This site in Essex was used as 'Maplins' in the BBC comedy Hi-De-Hi!. This site was badly damaged in the Great Storm of 1987 and closed shortly after.

Minster
On the Isle of Sheppey, closed in the 1980s, many buildings survive but are now privately owned.

Northney
The first Warner camp on Hayling Island. Closed and redeveloped for housing in the 1980s.

Southleigh
On Hayling Island. An original Warner camp. It closed in the 1980s and the site redeveloped for housing.

Woodside Bay
On the Isle of Wight, near Pontins Little Canada. Only open for less than 20 years and demolished after closure. Now the site of a holiday park.

Caister
Caister on Sea Holiday Park, near Great Yarmouth is still operational and part of Haven Holidays.

Devon Coast
Originally called Devon Coast Country Club, this full board camp opened after the war and despite its name was actually located 1.5 miles inland from the coast!
 
By the 1970s it was owned by Ladbrokes. Around 1990 it became a Warner Holiday Camp as an adults only camp. Following changes to Warner Holidays it became branded as Shearings around 1992/3 but only lasted until 1994 before being closed down and the land sold for housing development.

Sussex Coast
Originally Southdean Holiday Camp. First opened in 1922 as 'New City Holiday Camp' by Sir Walter Blount on the site of an old aircraft factory in Middleton on Sea near Bognor Regis. The hangers were retained and converted into a dining hall, dance hall and indoor tennis courts. After the war it changed hands several times and a new hotel was added. It had a number of different names over the years including Southdean, the South Coast Country Club and finally Sussex Coast holiday centre. For a time it was owned by the Dean family who had given Fred Pontin his start in 1946 by selling him their original camps at Brean Sands and Osmington Bay. In later years it was owned by Warners and then Shearings as an adults only camp. It closed in the late 1990s and the land has been redeveloped for housing.

Self Catering Sites
In the 1990s former Ladbrokes holidays camps were branded as Warner Self Catering sites - many of these sites have since been sold off or closed. They were marketed as Holiday Centres and Holiday Villages.

Holiday Centres
 Caister - Suffolk
 Silver Sands - Suffolk
 Seashore - Suffold
 Cayton Bay - Yorkshire
 Carmarthen Bay - South Wales
 Perran Sands - Cornwall

Holiday Villages
 Riviere Sands - Cornwall
 Trelawne Manor - Cornwall
 Torquay - Devon
 Devon Valley - Devon
 Lyme Bay - Devon
 Chesil Beach - Dorset
 Seaview - Dorset
 Fort Warden - Isle of Wight
 Nodes Point - Isle of Wight
 Lower Hyde - Isle of Wight

References

Hotel and leisure companies of the United Kingdom
Hospitality companies established in 1994
British companies established in 1994
1994 establishments in England